Polton is a music record label, established in Poland in 1983. It was one of the three (together with Savitor and Arston) better known Polonia-assisted Polish record labels.

In 1990-1991 it was overtaken by Starstream Communications Group and eventually by Warner Music Group (Polton / Warner Music Poland), the latter eventually closed its office in Poland.

References

Polish record labels
Record labels established in 1983
1983 establishments in Poland
State-owned record labels